The Durant Touring Car was manufactured by Durant Motors, Inc.

Durant Touring Car specifications (1926 data) 

 Color – No. 9 blue
 Seating Capacity – Five
 Wheelbase – 109 inches
 Wheels – Disc
 Tires - 31” x 4” cord
 Service Brakes – Contracting on rear wheels
 Emergency Brakes – Expanding on rear wheels
 Engine  - Four cylinder, vertical, cast en bloc, 3-7/8 x 4-1/4 inches; head removable; valves in side; H.P. 24.03 N.A.C.C. rating
 Lubrication – Force feed and splash
 Crankshaft - Three bearing
 Radiator – Cellular type
 Cooling – Centrifugal pump
 Ignition – Storage Battery
 Starting System – Two Unit
 Voltage – Six
 Wiring System – Single
 Gasoline System – Vacuum
 Clutch – Single plate, dry disc
 Transmission – Selective sliding
 Gear Changes – 3 forward, 1 reverse
 Drive – Spiral bevel
 Springs – Semi-elliptic
 Rear Axle – Semi-floating
 Steering Gear – Worm and gear

Standard equipment
New car price included the following items:
 tools
 jack
 speedometer
 ammeter
 electric horn
 transmission theft lock
 demountable rims
 spare tire carrier
 closed cars have rear view mirror, sun visor, cowl ventilator, corner lights and heater.

Prices
New car prices were F.O.B. factory, plus tax:
 Touring - $830
 Coach - $1050
 Coupé - $1160
 Sedan - $1190

See also
 Durant Motors
 Durant (automobile)

References
Source: 

Durant Motors